The Casbah is a nightclub and music venue located near downtown San Diego, California.

History
The Casbah was first opened in 1989 by Tim Mays, Bob Bennett and Peter English at the site of a former Irish pub at 2812 Kettner Boulevard. The three men also owned the now-defunct Pink Panther Club. The Casbah hosted San Diego bands such as Rocket from the Crypt, Lucy's Fur Coat, Trumans Water, Three Mile Pilot, Creedle, Heavy Vegetable, Fluf, Inch, Crash Worship and Deadbolt. It also hosted bands such as Nirvana and The Smashing Pumpkins. English later left the venture.

Because the original site had a maximum occupancy of 75 people, in 1994 the Casbah moved to a larger facility at 2501 Kettner Boulevard, the site of former club "Bulc". The new location has a maximum occupancy of more than 200.

The club usually hosts live music six to seven nights each week. Bands that have played at the current location include: Alanis Morissette, The Breeders, Ben Harper, The Cult, Blink-182, and Dinosaur Jr.

References

External links

Buildings and structures in San Diego
Music venues in California
Nightclubs in California
Punk rock venues
Music venues completed in 1989